Six ships of the Royal Navy have borne the name HMS Trent, after the River Trent:

  was a 28-gun sixth-rate frigate launched in 1757 and sold in 1764.
  was a 36-gun fifth-rate frigate launched in 1796. She became a hospital ship in 1803, a receiving ship in 1818 and was broken up in 1823. She was used by John Franklin sailing under the command of David Buchan in the Arctic.
 HMS Trent was a 17-gun sloop laid down in 1862.  She was selected for conversion to an ironclad, and renamed  later that year, before being launched in 1863.
  was a  launched in 1877.  She was renamed HMS Pembroke in 1905, and HMS Gannet in 1917 when she served as a diving tender.  She was scrapped in 1923.
  was a  launched in 1942.  She was transferred to the Royal Indian Navy in 1946 and was renamed Kukri.  She was converted into a survey vessel in 1952 and renamed Investigator.  She was broken up in 1975.
  is a Batch 2  currently in service. She was commissioned on 3 August 2020.

See also
 The mail steamer , at the centre of the Trent Affair.

Royal Navy ship names